Kaleidoscope is the second album from Christian pop singer Rachael Lampa, released in 2002 on Word Records.

Track listing

Singles

 "No Greater Love" No. 2 AC
 "Savior Song" No. 5 CHR
 "I'm All Yours" No. 3 AC; No. 9 CHR
 "Brand New Life" No. 17

Other remixes

Found on the album Blur
 "Savior Song (Sonic Overload Mix)"
 "I'm All Yours (Girrafro Phat Funk Mix)
 "Brand New Life (Sunny Day Mix)"
 "Lead Me (I'll Follow) (Elevation Mix)"
 "For Your Love (Gravity Moon Mix)"
" A Song for You (London Daydream Mix)"

Personnel 

 Racheal Lampa – lead vocals, backing vocals (11)
 Brent Bourgeois – Wurlitzer electric piano (1), backing vocals (2)
 Dan Needham – programming (1), drums (1, 2, 4, 7, 8)
 Pete Kipley – programming (2, 3, 4, 6, 9)
 Bernie Herms – programming (5, 7, 10, 11), orchestral arrangements (5)
 David Mullen – programming (8)
 Andy Spivey – programming (8)
 Chris Rodriguez – electric guitars (1–10), acoustic guitar (3–6, 10), backing vocals (4, 9)
 Tommy Sims – bass (1, 2, 4, 7, 8)
 Leland Sklar – bass (5)
 Eric Darken – percussion (3, 4, 10, 11), drums (5)
 Mike Haynes – trumpet (2, 6)
 Tom Howard – orchestral arrangements (10)
 The London Session Orchestra – orchestra (5, 10)
 Gavyn Wright – concertmaster (5, 10)
 Carl Marsh – conductor (5, 10)
 Paige Lewis – backing vocals (1, 2, 9)
 Molly Felder – backing vocals (2)
 Natalie LaRue – backing vocals (2)
 Ruby Amanfu – backing vocals (3)
 Lisa Cochran – backing vocals (4)
 Tiffany Palmer – backing vocals (6, 8)
 LaTara Conley – backing vocals (7, 8)
 Gene Miller – backing vocals (7, 8)
 Chris Willis – backing vocals (7, 8)
 Jerard Woods – backing vocals (7, 8)
 Jovaun Woods – backing vocals (7, 8)

Production

 Brown Bannister – producer
 Brent Bourgeois – producer, executive producer
 Bernie Herms – associate producer
 Pete Kipley – associate producer
 Steve Bishir – recording, mixing (1, 3, 4, 5, 7–10)
 F. Reid Shippen – mixing (2, 11)
 David Schober – mixing (6)
 Bob Clark – recording assistant
 Hank Nirider – recording assistant
 Chris Schmerback – recording assistant
 Jeph Foster – orchestra recording at AIR Lyndhurst, London, UK
 Steve Hall – mastering at Future Disc Systems, Hollywood, California
 Traci Sterling Bishir – production manager
 Michelle Bentrem – production management assistant
 Astrid Herbold May – art direction, design
 Robert Sebree – photography
 Lisa Fanudy – hair, make-up
 Joline Towers – stylist

Studios

 The Parlor, Nashville, Tennessee – recording location, mixing location 
 Masterlink, Nashville, Tennessee – recording location
 Dark Horse Recording Studio, Franklin, Tennessee – recording location, mixing location
 Recording Arts, Nashville, Tennessee – mixing location

References 

2002 albums
Rachael Lampa albums